Church ruins is a Cultural Monument of Albania in Krujë.

References

Cultural Monuments of Albania
Church ruins in Albania
Buildings and structures in Krujë